The  is a Japanese railway line in Tottori Prefecture operated by the third-sector operating company . The line connects Kōge Station in Yazu with Wakasa Station in Wakasa. It is the only railway line operated by the Wakasa Railway. The third-sector company took over operations of the former West Japan Railway Company (JR West) line in 1987.

Owners and operator

The line is operated by Wakasa Railway Co., Ltd. Although the company originally owned the railway line, on April 1, 2009, the ownership was transferred to the municipalities (towns) where the line exists and the company became a pure operator of the railway as a Category 2 Railway Operator. The town of Yazu owns 16.5 km of track and the town of Wakasa owns 2.7 km of track as Category 3 Railway Operators.

Stations
 Some trains operate through from the JR West Imbi Line (Tottori - Kōge).

Rolling stock

Diesel railcars
From the start of third-sector operations in 1987, the line was operated using a fleet of four WT2500 series diesel cars. Three of these were subsequently refurbished, becoming WT3000 series, and a new stainless steel WT3300 series diesel car, WT3301, was also added to the fleet.

Locomotives
The railway owns a former JNR Class DD16 diesel locomotive, number DD16 7, previously used at the Railway Technical Research Institute in Kokubunji, Tokyo, and former JNR Class C12 2-6-2T steam locomotive number C12 167.

History
The line opened on 20 January 1930 as the 4.5 km Wakasa Line from Kōge to Hayabusa. The entire line to Wakasa opened on 1 December 1930. The original plan was to extend the line beyond Wakasa to the Sanin Main Line, near Yōka Station, but this was never realized.

Freight services were discontinued from 1 October 1974.

With the privatization of JNR in April 1987, the Wakasa Line was transferred to the ownership of West Japan Railway Company (JR West). However, JR West ceased operations on the line on 13 October 1987, with operations taken over by the third-sector Wakasa Railway Company from 14 October.

See also
List of railway companies in Japan
List of railway lines in Japan

References

External links
  

Railway lines in Japan
Rail transport in Tottori Prefecture
1067 mm gauge railways in Japan
Japanese third-sector railway lines